Psychomastatix is a genus of insect in family Eumastacidae. It contains the following species:
 Psychomastatix deserticola

References 

Caelifera genera
Taxonomy articles created by Polbot